The Hall of Great Western Performers is a Hall of Fame at the National Cowboy & Western Heritage Museum. It is located in Oklahoma City, Oklahoma and sometimes referred to as the "Western Performers Hall of Fame". It is a  presentation that explores the various ways the west has been interpreted in literature and film. Every year the Museum inducts performers into the Hall of Fame at the same time the Western Heritage Awards are given out.

Honoring Western performers who have contributed to the making and preservation of the stories and legends of the West, the gallery also displays a presentation of the museum's extensive collection of memorabilia, including the John Wayne collection of personal firearms and artwork. Significant, biographically associated artifacts, from the 101 Ranch Wild West Show to more recent Western films are part of the extensive holdings of movie posters and portraits.

Hall of Fame members
The following are members of the Hall of Great Western Performers, followed by the year they were inducted:

See also
 Rodeo Hall of Fame
 Hall of Great Westerners

References

External links
 OfficialSite

1955 establishments in Oklahoma
American film awards
West
Culture of Oklahoma City
Culture of the Western United States
Cowboy halls of fame
Sports halls of fame
Sports hall of fame inductees
Awards established in 1955
Lists of sports awards
National Cowboy & Western Heritage Museum